The IEEE Reynold B. Johnson Data Storage Device Technology Award was a Technical Field Award of the IEEE that was established by the IEEE Board of Directors in 2004 and was discontinued in 2011.  The award was presented annually from 2006–2010 for outstanding contributions to the advancement of information storage, with an emphasis on technical contributions in computer data storage device technology.  The award was named to honor Reynold B. Johnson.

The award was presented to three co-recipients in 2006, and to individuals from 2007–2010.

Recipients of this award received a bronze medal, certificate, and honorarium.

Recipients 
 2010: David B. Bogy
 2009: Kinam Kim 
 2008: Stanley H. Charap 
 2007: Mason L. Williams
 2006: Eliyahou Harari 
 2006: Sanjay Mehrotra
 2006: Jack Yuan

References

External links 
 IEEE Reynold B. Johnson Data Storage Device Technology Award page at IEEE
 List of recipients of the IEEE Reynold B. Johnson Data Storage Device Technology Award

Reynold B. Johnson Data Storage Device Technology Award